This article is a very incomplete list of the tallest buildings in each county of Michigan. Currently, only 23 out of 83 counties are listed. Any counties not listed should be added when the information is available.

List

References

Michigan
Tallest